The 1947 Claxton Shield was the eighth annual Claxton Shield, an Australian national baseball tournament. It was held at the Adelaide Oval in Adelaide from 2 to 9 August, and was won by Victoria for the first time. The other participating teams were defending champions New South Wales, hosts South Australia and the returning Western Australian team.

Format
With the return of Western Australia to the tournament, the four teams played a round-robin schedule, meeting each other team once, with two competition points were on offer in each game. The points were awarded as follows:
 Win – two points
 Tie – one point
 Loss – no points
At the end of these preliminary games, the top two teams played each other to determine the champions.

Results

Preliminaries

Final

All-Australian team
At the conclusion of the tournament, representatives from the Australian Baseball Council selected an All-Australian team. It was the third such Australian team selected at the end of a Claxton Shield tournament. South Australian players made up the largest proportion in the squad, despite not being the champion team of the year, while champions Victoria had only two players selected: the smallest from any team, along with Western Australia.

References

Bibliography
 

Claxton Shield
Claxton Shield
Claxton Shield
August 1947 sports events in Australia